Jamie Harris may refer to:

 Jamie Harris (actor) (born 1963), British actor
 Jamie Harris (footballer) (born 1979), Welsh footballer